Grégoire Burquier was the defending champion but decided not to participate.
Jesse Huta Galung won the final 7–6(7–4), 4–6, 7–6(7–3) against Kenny de Schepper.

Seeds

Draw

Finals

Top half

Bottom half

References
 Main Draw
 Qualifying Draw

Open Harmonie mutuelle - Singles
2013 Singles